Middle East Airlines – Air Liban S.A.L., more commonly known as Middle East Airlines (MEA), is the national flag-carrier airline of Lebanon, with its head office in Beirut, near Beirut–Rafic Hariri International Airport. It operates scheduled international flights to Asia, Europe, the Middle East, and Africa from its base at Rafic Hariri International Airport.

Middle East Airlines (MEA) is a member of the SkyTeam airline alliance. MEA expressed its interest in becoming a SkyTeam associate member in early 2006 at a press conference in New York.
On 28 February 2011, the airline signed the partnership agreement with SkyTeam at a ceremony in Beirut, and officially joined the alliance on 28 June 2012, becoming its 17th member and the second member airline in the Middle East.

History

Middle East Airlines was founded on 31 May 1945 by Saeb Salam and Fawzi EL-Hoss with operational and technical support from BOAC. Operations started on 1 January 1946 using three de Havilland DH.89A Dragon Rapides on flights between Beirut and Nicosia, followed by flights to Iraq, Egypt, and Syria. Two Douglas DC-3s were acquired in mid-1946. Pan American World Airways acquired a stake and management contract in September 1949.

Pan Am was replaced when BOAC acquired 49% of MEA's shares in 1955. A Vickers Viscount was introduced in October 1955 while an Avro York cargo aircraft was leased in June 1957. On 15 December 1960 the first of four de Havilland Comet 4Cs arrived.  After the association with BOAC ended on 16 August 1961, MEA was merged with Air Liban on 7 June 1963, which gave Air France a 30% holding (since relinquished). The full title was then Middle East Airlines – Air Liban.  
    
In 1963 MEA also took over Lebanese International Airways. The fleet was modernised with the addition of three Sud Aviation Caravelles in April 1963, three Boeing 720Bs in January 1966, one leased Vickers VC10 in March 1967, and a number of Boeing 707-320Cs from November 1967.   
    
The current name was adopted in November 1965 when the airline was completely merged with Air Liban.  Although operations were interrupted by the 1967 Arab–Israeli war, and by the Israeli raid on Beirut Airport in 1968 - in which the airline lost three Comet 4C's, two Caravelles, a Boeing 707, the Vickers VC10, and the Vickers Viscount - MEA restarted by acquiring a Convair 990A from American Airlines, which entered service on 24 June 1969.    
    
A Boeing 747-200B entered service in June 1975 on the Beirut–London route, and later on the Beirut–Paris–New York route from April 1983 until mid-1985. MEA had to adjust its operations due to the Lebanese Civil War between 1975 and 1991 but continued services despite multiple closures of the base at Beirut International Airport. Airbus A310-300s were acquired in 1993 and 1994, followed by an A321-200 in 1997 and the A330-200 (which replaced the A310s) in 2003.

The airline has introduced self-check-in kiosks at Beirut International Airport as of July 2010. The airline is also planning on launching the Arabesk Airline Alliance with six other Arab carriers. Their future plans include floating about 25% of their shares on the Beirut Stock Exchange (BSE) as part of a long-term plan to fully privatize the airline.

In November 2011, MEA's pilots union staged a 48-hour strike after a captain undergoing cancer treatment was dismissed shortly after going on sick leave.    
    
On 28 June 2012, Middle East Airlines joined the SkyTeam alliance to become its 17th member and the second in the Middle East following Saudia. 5,000 staff are employed across the airline group. The central bank of Lebanon, Banque du Liban, owns a majority share of 99.50%.

Destinations

Middle East Airlines flies to 31 destinations in the Middle East, Europe, and Africa. 
In addition, Medina is served seasonally, while Mykonos is offered as a seasonal charter destination.

Codeshare agreements
MEA has codeshare agreements with the following airlines:

 Aeroflot
 Air Canada
 Air Europa
 Air France
 Czech Airlines
 Etihad Airways
 Gulf Air
 ITA Airways
 Kuwait Airways
 Qatar Airways 
 Royal Jordanian
 Saudia
 Sky Express
 TAROM
 Tunisair
 Turkish Airlines
 Virgin Atlantic

MEA also participates in SNCF's (French National Railways) tgvair program.

Fleet

Current fleet

MEA (excluding Cedar Executive) operates an all-Airbus fleet. , it consists of the following aircraft:

Historic fleet

Airbus A300B4
Airbus A300-600
Airbus A310-200
Airbus A310-300
Airbus A321-200
Avro York
Boeing 707-320C
Boeing 720B
Boeing 747-100
Boeing 747-200B
Convair CV-990A
de Havilland Comet
Douglas DC-3
Douglas DC-4
Sud Aviation SE 210 Caravelle
Vickers VC10
Vickers Viscount

Fleet development

Middle East Airlines firmed up its order for ten Airbus A320neo family aircraft (five A320neo and five A321neo) in January 2013. The order for the A320neo was later converted to five more A321neo aircraft. The first A321neo was delivered on 10 July 2020; the third, delivered 9 October 2020, was the 10,000th A320 family aircraft produced.

On 12 December 2018, the then-Prime Minister of Lebanon, Saad Hariri, signed an order with engine manufacturer Rolls-Royce Holdings for four Airbus A330-900s. During the 2019 Paris Air Show, the airline became the launch customer for the A321XLR: four XLRs were ordered, intended for use on routes to Africa and Asia.

Cedar Executive, MEA's business jet subsidiary, took delivery of its first Embraer Legacy 500 on 5 January 2016.

Frequent-flyer program
In 2011, Middle East Airlines changed its frequent-flyer program to a 4-tier program- Blue Cedar, Silver Cedar, Golden Cedar, and President's Club, respectively- in preparation for joining the SkyTeam airline alliance. Silver Cedar, Golden Cedar, and President's Club members gain numerous benefits such as access to the Cedar Lounge at Beirut-Rafic Hariri International Airport, as well as outstation lounges at all MEA destinations. Golden Cedar and President's Club offer additional benefits, including guaranteed economy seat reservation.

Cedar Miles can be earned and redeemed on all MEA flights and on all flights operated by Air France, KLM, and Qatar Airways, as well as codeshare partners on certain routes. Cedar Miles can also be earned during stays at all Rotana Hotels and all Hertz car rentals worldwide.

Subsidiaries
MEA owns the following subsidiaries, which are operated independently:
Cedar Executive
Founded in January 2016, Cedar Executive is a private jet service based at Beirut Rafic Hariri International Airport which operates business flights across Europe and the Middle East, using two Embraer Legacy 500s. Clients have access to a private lounge and chauffeur service to the flight.
  
Middle East Airlines Ground Handling (MEAG)
Founded in 1999, MEAG is the main ground handling agent at Beirut International Airport, handling nearly 80% of all traffic. MEAG also operates a fixed-base operator called Cedar Jet Center at the General Aviation Terminal.

Middle East Airports Services (MEAS)
Founded in 1998, MEAS is responsible for the operation and maintenance of Beirut International Airport. Services range from cleaning of the terminals to de-rubberising the runways.

Mideast Aircraft Services Company (MASCO)
Founded in 1955, MASCO is the only fully-fledged aircraft maintenance, repair, and overhaul provider at Beirut International Airport. MASCO is a part 145 EASA-approved MRO with full airframe check capabilities on the Airbus A300, A310, A320, and A330 family aircraft. MASCO is also certified to carry out aircraft painting.

In addition, MEA owns 77.5% of the Lebanese Beirut Airport Catering Company (LBACC), the only catering provider at Beirut International Airport.

Accidents and incidents

On 24 July 1950, an Air Liban Douglas DC-3, registration LR-AAN was shot at by an Israeli Spitfire; the DC-3 landed safely at Beirut Airport, but 3 passengers (of 28 on board) were killed in the attack.
On 6 January 1952, Air Liban SNCASE Languedoc OD-ABU crashed on take-off from Beirut Airport, and was consequently destroyed by fire. All nine passengers and crew on board survived. The aircraft was operating a scheduled international passenger flight from Beirut to Kuwait Airport, Kuwait.
On 29 September 1958, Middle East Airlines Avro York OD-ADB disappeared over the Mediterranean Sea with five on board.
On 1 February 1963, Flight 265, a Vickers Viscount 754D registered OD-ADE, was involved in a mid-air collision with Turkish Air Force C-47 CBK28. Both aircraft crashed in Ankara, killing all 14 on board the Viscount, all 3 on board the C-47 and a further 87 people on the ground.
On 17 April 1964, Flight 444, operated by Sud Caravelle III OD-AEM struck the sea near Dhahran, Saudi Arabia, killing all 49 on board; the cause of the accident was not determined.
On 21 April 1964, Middle East Airlines Vickers Viscount 754D OD-ACX was damaged beyond economic repair at El Arish, Egypt after the taxiway it was taxiing on collapsed.
On 28 December 1968, seven  MEA aircraft were destroyed in a raid by Israeli commandos at Beirut International Airport. This attack was in retaliation for a terrorist attack on an El Al Boeing aircraft in Athens which killed an Israeli mechanic.
On 1 January 1976, Flight 438, operated by Boeing 720B OD-AFT broke up in mid-air after the explosion of a bomb allegedly placed in the forward cargo compartment. All 81 people on board were killed, some of whom were fleeing the ongoing Lebanese Civil War. The aircraft crashed near Al Qaysumah, Saudi Arabia.
On 12 June 1982, in response to the attempted assassination by the Abu Nidal Group of the Israeli ambassador to Britain, the Israeli army attacked the airport in Beirut, destroying Middle East Airlines Boeing 720-023B OD-AFP. Four days later, four more aircraft (three 720s and one 707) were destroyed in a second attack. On 1 August 1982, a 14-hour non-stop bombing raid on Beirut destroyed Boeing 720-047B OD-AGG.
On 21 August 1985, two MEA Boeing 720's (OD-AFL and OD-AGQ) were destroyed by shelling at Beirut International Airport.
On 8 January 1987, Boeing 707-323C OD-AHB was destroyed by shelling after landing at Beirut International Airport.
On 16 November 2001 an Airbus A321-200, with the registration F-OHMP, was operating as Flight 304 from Beirut International Airport to Cairo International Airport when it sustained damage during a tail strike accident upon landing at Cairo, This airframe would be destroyed by a bomb nearly 14 years later midflight as Metrojet Flight 9268.

See also

Lebanese identity card
List of airports in Lebanon
Lebanese passport
SkyTeam
Transport in Lebanon
Visa policy of Lebanon
Visa requirements for Lebanese citizens

Notes

References

External links

Official SkyTeam website

 
Airlines of Lebanon
Airlines established in 1945
1945 establishments in Lebanon
Arab Air Carriers Organization members
Government-owned airlines
Lebanese governmental organisations
Lebanese brands
SkyTeam